"About Work the Dancefloor" is a song by English musician Georgia. Co-written by Georgia and Mark Ralph, both of whom also produced the song alongside Sean Oakley, it was released by Domino Recording Company on 28 March 2019.

Background and composition
Georgia stated that "About Work the Dancefloor" was written "in response to the clubbing culture [she] experienced in cities whilst touring". The song has been described as featuring "the tight electronic sequences of new wave", with its lyrics "as vulnerable as a handwritten note". It also contains "driving, arpeggiated synth bassline" and "washed out, kaleidoscopic analogue synths".

Release and promotion
In June 2019, remixes of the song by American DJ The Blessed Madonna were released.

Critical reception
Writing for Pitchfork, Michelle Kim called the hook "provocative" and praised Georgia's "disarmingly tender vocals". James Rettig of Stereogum deemed the song an "absolute powerhouse of a track".

Accolades
"About Work the Dancefloor" won the 2019 Popjustice £20 Music Prize. The song also topped PopMatters Best Dance Tracks of 2019 list. In 2020, it received NME Award nominations for Best British Single and Best Song in the World.

Charts

Release history

References

External links

2019 singles
2019 songs
Synth-pop songs
Songs written by Mark Ralph (record producer)
Song recordings produced by Mark Ralph (record producer)